Robert Morgan Miller (born 25 January 1949) is a former professional footballer who played as a winger.

Miller was born in Lochgelly and played junior football with Lochore Welfare before starting his professional career with Rangers in 1965. After one season at Ibrox, he joined East Fife in 1966. In September 1971, Aberdeen manager Jimmy Bonthrone paid East Fife £35,000 to sign Miller (including Jim Hamilton as part of the deal). In December 1973 he rejoined East Fife, and later played for Montrose (from October 1975), Raith Rovers (from August 1979)  Cowdenbeath (from February 1982) before retiring in 1984.

See also
 List of footballers in Scotland by number of league appearances (500+)

References

1949 births
People from Lochgelly
Scottish footballers
Rangers F.C. players
East Fife F.C. players
Aberdeen F.C. players
Montrose F.C. players
Raith Rovers F.C. players
Cowdenbeath F.C. players
Scottish Football League players
Living people
Association football midfielders
Lochore Welfare F.C. players
Scottish Junior Football Association players